Gordon Waterfield (1903–1987) was a British journalist, broadcaster and writer. He is chiefly known for his book What Happened to France?, in which he documents his experiences as a journalist in France during World War II.
He was featured on the 1973 documentary The World at War.

Selected works 
 Lucie Duff Gordon in England, South Africa and Egypt (1937).
 What Happened to France? (1940)
 Layard of Nineveh (1963)
 Egypty (1967)
 Sultans of Aden (1968).
 Professional Diplomat: Sir Percy Loraine of Kirkharle. (1973)

References 

1903 births
1987 deaths
20th-century British journalists